Sutna may refer to:

Šutna, Kranj
Šutna, Krško
Satna